Gyula Petrikovics (12 January 1943 – 28 June 2005) was a Hungarian sprint canoer who competed from the late 1960s to the early 1970s. At the 1968 Summer Olympics in Mexico City, he won a silver medal in the C-2 1000 m event.

Petrikovics also won a complete set of medals in the C-2 1000 m event at the ICF Canoe Sprint World Championships (gold: 1971, silver: 1970, bronze: 1973).

References

1943 births
2005 deaths
Canoeists at the 1968 Summer Olympics
Hungarian male canoeists
Olympic canoeists of Hungary
Olympic silver medalists for Hungary
Olympic medalists in canoeing
ICF Canoe Sprint World Championships medalists in Canadian

Medalists at the 1968 Summer Olympics
20th-century Hungarian people